Fahad Iqbal (born 25 February 1986) is a Pakistani cricketer who played for Pakistan International Airlines. In March 2019, he was named in Punjab's squad for the 2019 Pakistan Cup.

References

External links
 

1986 births
Living people
Pakistani cricketers
Karachi cricketers
Karachi Port Trust cricketers
Pakistan International Airlines cricketers
Cricketers from Karachi